Bengough-Milestone was a provincial electoral district for the Legislative Assembly of Saskatchewan, Canada. This constituency was created before the 1975 Saskatchewan general election. It was redistributed before the 1995 Saskatchewan general election.

Member of the Legislative Assembly

Election results

|-

|Prog. Conservative
|E.R. Moody
|align="right"|2,512
|align="right"|34.61
|align="right"|-

|- bgcolor="white"
!align="left" colspan=3|Total
!align="right"|7,258
!align="right"|100.00
!align="right"|

|-

|style="width: 130px"|Prog. Conservative
|Robert Hugh Pickering
|align="right"|3,118
|align="right"|43.28
|align="right"|-

|- bgcolor="white"
!align="left" colspan=3|Total
!align="right"|7,205
!align="right"|100.00(1)
!align="right"|

|-

|style="width: 130px"|Prog. Conservative
|Robert Hugh Pickering
|align="right"|4,561
|align="right"|59.75
|align="right"|-

|- bgcolor="white"
!align="left" colspan=3|Total
!align="right"|7,634
!align="right"|100.00
!align="right"|

|-

|style="width: 130px"|Prog. Conservative
|Robert Hugh Pickering
|align="right"|3,740
|align="right"|54.50
|align="right"|-

|- bgcolor="white"
!align="left" colspan=3|Total
!align="right"|6,862
!align="right"|100.00(1)
!align="right"|

|-

|Prog. Conservative
|Darrell Rodine
|align="right"|2,297
|align="right"|36.00
|align="right"|-

|- bgcolor="white"
!align="left" colspan=3|Total
!align="right"|6,381
!align="right"|100.00
!align="right"|

Notes

1. Percentages may not add up exactly due to rounding

References
Saskatchewan Archives Board - Saskatchewan Election Results by Electoral Division

See also
Electoral district (Canada)
List of Saskatchewan provincial electoral districts
List of Saskatchewan general elections
List of political parties in Saskatchewan

Former provincial electoral districts of Saskatchewan